Bishop Paul McAleenan is a Northern Irish-born Auxiliary Bishop for the Roman Catholic Diocese of Westminster in England.

Born in Belfast, Northern Ireland on 15 July 1951, McAleenan attended St Gabriel's Secondary School in Belfast.  He worked in Engineering prior to entering the priesthood in 1979.  NcAlleenan trained for the priesthood in St. Patrick's College, Thurles in Tipperary County, Ireland, and was ordained in 1985, for the Diocese of Westminster.

McAleenan served for 30 years in several English parishes.  He was named Canon prior to his appointment as Auxiliary Bishop of Westminster in November 2015.  As an auxiliary bishop, he has pastoral oversight for the deaneries of Hertfordshire.

British human rights activist and journalist William Gomes has criticised Bishop McAleenan for ignoring him and listening him and others with lived experiences of racism

References

1951 births
Living people
21st-century Roman Catholic bishops in England
Alumni of St. Patrick's College, Thurles
Clergy from Belfast